In mathematical analysis, constructive function theory is a field which studies the connection between the smoothness of a function and its degree of approximation. It is closely related to approximation theory. The term was coined by Sergei Bernstein.

Example

Let f be a 2π-periodic function. Then f is α-Hölder for some 0 < α < 1 if and only if for every natural n there exists a trigonometric polynomial Pn of degree n such that
 
where C(f) is a positive number depending on f. The "only if" is due to Dunham Jackson, see  Jackson's inequality; the "if" part is due to Sergei Bernstein, see Bernstein's theorem (approximation theory).

Notes

References

 
 
 
 

Approximation theory
Smooth functions